Stockyard or Stockyards may refer to:

Places
Stockyard, Queensland, Australia, locality in the Shire of Livingstone
Stockyard Landing, original name of Arabi, Louisiana
Stockyards, California, former town
Stockyards, nickname for the northwest quadrant of The Junction, Toronto, Ontario, Canada
Fort Worth Stockyards, a historic district in Fort Worth, Texas

Other uses
A feedlot or other gathering point for livestock, especially cattle
STOCKYARD Magazine, a Chicago-based publication
Stockyard, amateur baseball team in the Boston Park League, Massachusetts, United States

See also
Meat packing industry
Union Stock Yards
Yard (disambiguation)